Private Thomas Davis (or Davies; December 11, 1837 – March 24, 1919) was a Welsh soldier who fought in the American Civil War. Davis received the United States' highest award for bravery during combat, the Medal of Honor, for his action during the Battle of Sayler's Creek in Virginia on 6 April 1865. He was honored with the award on 3 May 1865.

Biography
Davis was born in Haverfordwest, Wales on 11 December 1837. He joined the 2nd New York Heavy Artillery in December 1863, and mustered out with the regiment in September 1865. He died on 24 March 1919 and his remains are interred at the Mount Olivet Cemetery in New York.

Medal of Honor citation

See also

List of American Civil War Medal of Honor recipients: A–F

References

1837 births
1919 deaths
Welsh-born Medal of Honor recipients
Welsh emigrants to the United States
People of New York (state) in the American Civil War
Union Army officers
United States Army Medal of Honor recipients
American Civil War recipients of the Medal of Honor
Burials at Mount Olivet Cemetery (Queens)
People from Haverfordwest
People from Maspeth, Queens